Modern Skate and Surf was founded in 1979 by George Leichtweis. The retailer, with three brick and mortar locations in Michigan and an online shop at www.modernskate.com, specializes in equipment and accessories for snowboarding, skateboarding, inline skating, and wakeboarding. Modern Skate currently has one World Class Indoor Skate Park in Royal Oak, Michigan.

History
Since opening its first store in Royal Oak, MI in 1979, Modern Skate and Surf has been a pioneer in the alternative sports market.  Modern skate was one of the first three inline skate shops in the world, along with being the first snowboard and wakeboard shop in Michigan. Additionally, Modern is still one of the longest-standing skateboard shops in the state.  The company currently maintains retail locations in East Lansing and Royal Oak, MI.

Skate parks
In 1999, Modern Skate and Surf opened their first skate park in Ferndale, Michigan. Although this location has since closed, Modern Skate still has one skate park in Royal Oak. Grand Rapids, MI also had a long-standing Modern skatepark, but was closed in 2011. In addition to these two skate parks, Modern Skate was one of the main driving forces behind the fund-raising for Ranney Skate Park in Lansing, MI.

References

Royal Oak, Michigan
Companies based in Oakland County, Michigan
1979 establishments in Michigan
Sporting goods retailers of the United States
Snowboarding in the United States
Retail companies established in 1979
Skateboarding companies
Snowboarding companies
Inline skating
Skateparks in the United States
Wakeboarding